The 2020 Delaware Republican presidential primary took place on July 7, 2020 along with the New Jersey primary on the same day. 

Donald Trump won the primary by a wide margin. Rocky De La Fuente, the only candidate other than Trump on the ballot, won his highest share of the vote in this primary.

Results

Vote by county

References

Republican
Delaware
Delaware Republican primaries